The  is a limited express train service in Japan operated by East Japan Railway Company (JR East). It runs mainly between Shinjuku Station in Tokyo and Kōfu Station in Kōfu, Yamanashi via the Chūō Main Line. Chiba Kaiji, between Chiba and Ryūō, Hamakaiji, between Yokohama and Matsumoto, Yama Kaiji, Between Tachikawa and Kobuchizawa, also exist as seasonal variants.

Route

Kaiji

Chiba Kaiji
 -  -

Hamakaiji
 -  -

Yama Kaiji 
Tachikawa - Kobuchizawa

Rolling stock
From 2018, new E353 series EMUs were introduced on Kaiji services, replacing the E257 series trains. The new trains feature power outlets for passenger use and WiFi internet service.

Kaiji
E353 series EMUs (since 1 July 2018)
 Former
E257 series EMUs (from 2001 to 15 March 2019)
183/189 series EMUs (regular services until 2002 and seasonal extra services until 2018)

Chiba Kaiji 
E257-500 series

Hamakaiji
 185 series

Yama Kaiji 

E257-500 series

Formations

Current formation

E353 series Kaiji
All Kaiji (E353 series) services are formed of nine cars, numbered 4 to 12, with car 12 at the Kofu end. Between Shinjuku and Otsuki, 4 Kaiji services are coupled with Fuji Excursion trains, which are numbered cars 1 to 3. All seats were reserved; passengers without seat reservations may use non-occupied reserved seats.

Past formations

E353 series Kaiji
Between 1 July 2018 and 15 March 2019, trains were formed of nine cars, numbered 4 to 12, with car 12 at the Kofu end. Between Shinjuku and Otsuki, 4 Kaiji services are coupled with Fuji Excursion trains, which are numbered cars 1 to 3. Some cars were designated non-reserved cars.

E257 series Kaiji
Most Kaiji (E257 series) services were formed of nine cars, numbered 3 to 11, with car 11 at the Kofu end. Cars 1 and 2 were added to some trains.

185 series Hamakaiji 
The seasonal Hamakaiji services were formed of 7-car 185 series EMUs based at Tamachi Depot (Omiya Depot from 2013 onwards) in Tokyo, with car 1 at the Yokohama end.

History

Semi-express
The Kaiji service began on 1 October 1961 as a semi express operating between Shinjuku and Kōfu. The name was derived from the old name, of Yamanashi Prefecture. Services were operated using KiHa 58 series diesel multiple unit (DMU) trains in between duties on long-distance Alps and Hakuba express services. DMUs were used on these services due to the restricted tunnel clearances along the line prohibiting the use of electric trains. The outbound service departed from Shinjuku at 14:50, arriving at Kōfu at 17:19. The return working departed from Kōfu at 18:28, arriving at Shinjuku at 21:20. The Kaiji services were however discontinued and integrated with the Alps express services from the start of the revised timetable on 1 October 1965 when electric trains were introduced.

Express

The Kaiji name was revived from 12 December 1966 for use on express services aimed at business users, operating between Shinjuku and Matsumoto using 12-car 165 series EMU formations in between duties on longer-distance Alps services. The early morning up working departed from Matsumoto at 04:50, arriving at Shinjuku at 09:34. The evening down service departed from Shinjuku at 18:55, arriving at Matsumoto at 23:36. From the start of the 1 October 1968 timetable revision, the Shinjuku - Matsumoto service was integrated with the other Alps express services also operating between Shinjuku and Matsumoto, and the Kaiji name was used for five new return express services operating between Shinjuku and Kōfu. Due to the seasonal nature of ridership on these services, three of the five return workings were designated as seasonal services, operating only during peak seasons. These services were operated using outer-suburban 115 series EMUs, whereas the two regular services were operated using 165 series express EMUs with first-class accommodation and buffet facilities. In response to the lack of first class accommodation, a 115 series set reformed with a 165 series "SaRo 165" Green car was used on some services. The use of suburban rolling stock on express services requiring payment of a supplement was not popular, however, and the seasonal services were downgraded to "Rapid" services by 1978, leaving just the two regular Kaiji express services using 165 series rolling stock. The remaining Kaiji services were discontinued from the start of the 1 November 1986 timetable following the introduction of new Azusa limited express services.

Limited express

From 13 March 1988, five of the Azusa limited express services operating between Shinjuku and Kōfu were expanded to nine return workings daily and renamed Kaiji. Initially operated using 6-car 183 series EMUs, all Kaiji services were operated using 9-car sets from the start of the December 1993 timetable revision. These were lengthened to 11-car sets from October 1997.

Smoking was prohibited in all cars from 18 March 2007. From March 2019, the twice-daily 3-car Fuji Excursion (富士回遊) limited express services connecting Shinjuku and Kawaguchiko are coupled with the Kaiji services between Shinjuku and Otsuki. At Otsuki Station, the two trains decouple and separate.

See also
 List of named passenger trains of Japan

References

External links

 JR East E257 series Kaiji 

Named passenger trains of Japan
East Japan Railway Company
Railway services introduced in 1961
1961 establishments in Japan